Mauro Massironi (born 11 November 1979, in Vimercate) is an Italian racing driver. He has competed in such series as Porsche Supercup, Eurocup Formula Renault 2.0 and the British Formula Three Championship. His active racing career dates back to 2000, driving a Tatuus FR2000 (Renault) for B&B Birel. In 2006, he was the champion of the Italian Formula Three Championship for Passoli Racing, when he drive a Dallara F304 (Opel).

References

External links
 

1979 births
Living people
People from Vimercate
Italian racing drivers
Italian Formula Renault 2.0 drivers
Formula Renault Eurocup drivers
British Formula Three Championship drivers
Italian Formula Three Championship drivers
Porsche Supercup drivers
Sportspeople from the Province of Monza e Brianza

Ombra Racing drivers
RC Motorsport drivers